Murani may refer to:

 a village in Pișchia, Romania
 Murani, Iran, a village in Lorestan Province, Iran
 Murani, Isfahan, a village in Isfahan Province, Iran